D. Wayne Elhard (born 22 August 1947) is a Canadian provincial politician. He served as the Saskatchewan Party member of the Legislative Assembly of Saskatchewan for the constituency of Cypress Hills. Elhard was the first MLA elected under the Saskatchewan Party banner, as he was elected in a June 1999 by election.

References

Saskatchewan Party MLAs
Living people
Members of the Executive Council of Saskatchewan
1947 births
21st-century Canadian politicians